Chepiga ( or Чепега) is a surname. It means "ploughstaff" in Ukrainian. Notable people with the surname include:

 Anatoliy Chepiga (born 1979), Russian GRU colonel
 Sergey Chepiga (born 1982), Russian hurdler
 Valentina Chepiga (born 1962), Ukrainian bodybuilder

See also
 
 Chepiha

Surnames of Ukrainian origin